The Smith Hill Historic District is a historic district located in northwestern Providence, Rhode Island, just west of the Rhode Island State House and Interstate 95. It includes 57-65 Brownell Street, 73-114 Holden Street, 23-80 Jewett Street, 189-240 Smith Street and 10-18 W. Park Street.  This area is a densely built residential section, an isolated remnant of what was once a larger residential area.  Most of the 41 properties are residential units built between 1870 and 1930, and are typically 2-1/2 or  stories in height. They are set on lot sizes ranging generally from 3000 to 5000 square feet, and are set close to the sidewalk. The only major non-residential buildings are St. Patrick's School at 244 Smith Street and "The Mohican" at 185-189 Smith Street; the latter is an Art Deco brick and concrete commercial block two stories in height.

The district was added to the National Register of Historic Places in 1993.

See also
National Register of Historic Places listings in Providence, Rhode Island

References

Historic districts in Providence County, Rhode Island
Geography of Providence, Rhode Island
National Register of Historic Places in Providence, Rhode Island
Historic districts on the National Register of Historic Places in Rhode Island